Wright Patman Lake is a reservoir in northeast Texas in the United States.  The lake is a U.S. Army Corps of Engineers reservoir formed on the Sulphur River in Bowie and Cass counties by Wright Patman Dam. The reservoir provides flood control and water conservation for the communities downstream from the dam. The lake is also a popular recreational destination. The Bowie County side of the lake is part of the Texarkana metropolitan area.

Geography

It is located on the border between Bowie County and Cass County, Texas, and the geographic center is about 18 miles (29 km) southwest of Texarkana, Texas and 148 miles (238 km) east of Dallas. Towns in the immediate vicinity of the lake include Redwater, Maud, and Douglassville, Texas.

The lake is formed by water impounded by Wright Patman Dam.  The water is mainly from the Sulphur River, but several smaller creeks also flow into the lake.  The lake's conservation pool level is 220.6 feet (67.2 m) above sea level, and the spillway level is at 259.5 feet (79.1 m) above sea level.

History

Wright Patman Lake and Dam were authorized as part of the United States' Flood Contract Act of 1946.  Originally known as Texarkana Reservoir, the lake was later renamed to Lake Texarkana.  Construction of the dam began in 1948, and the lake was formed when water was impounded in 1953.  In 1973, the lake and dam were renamed in honor of Congressman Wright Patman of Texas.

Flood protection

Wright Patman Lake provides flood protection for areas downstream along the Sulphur River and Red River.  In the 38.9 feet (11.9 m) between its conservation pool and spillway levels, the lake can hold  of flood water.

Recreation

The U.S. Army Corps of Engineers maintains nine parks around Wright Patman Lake.  These parks provide lake access for boating, swimming, and fishing; as well as camping, picnicking, hiking, equestrian trails, and other outdoor activities.  Atlanta State Park is also located on the south shore of the lake.

References

External links
 Wright Patman Lake information from the U.S. Army Corps of Engineers
 
 Atlanta State Park information from the Texas Parks & Wildlife Department
 

Reservoirs in Texas
Protected areas of Bowie County, Texas
Protected areas of Cass County, Texas
Bodies of water of Bowie County, Texas
Bodies of water of Cass County, Texas
1953 establishments in Texas